Mohan Kumar may refer to:
 Mohan Kumar (director)
 Mohan Kumar (serial killer)